The Jaguars–Titans rivalry is a professional American football rivalry between the Jacksonville Jaguars and Tennessee Titans in the National Football League (NFL)'s AFC South division. While it isn't the most well-known or historic rivalry in the NFL, it is one of the more famous rivalries in the AFC South.

The first game of the rivalry was played on September 3, 1995, at TIAA Bank Field (then Jacksonville Municipal Stadium) in Jacksonville, Florida. In the first regular season game for Jacksonville's new expansion franchise, the Titans, then known as the Houston Oilers, defeated the Jaguars 10–3. The rivalry intensified during the 1999–2000 postseason, when the 14–2 Jaguars (both losses were against Tennessee), champions of the AFC Central division, hosted the newly named Titans, who were 13–3. The Titans erased a 14–10 halftime deficit to eventually win 33–14. The Titans then lost to the St. Louis Rams in Super Bowl XXXIV. As of 2023, the Titans lead the rivalry 34–23.

History

1990s
In 1993, the NFL awarded expansion franchises to the cities of Charlotte, North Carolina, and Jacksonville, Florida. The Charlotte franchise would become the Carolina Panthers of the National Football Conference, and the Jacksonville franchise would become the Jacksonville Jaguars of the American Football Conference. The Jaguars would compete in the Central division of the AFC along with the Cincinnati Bengals, Cleveland Browns, Houston Oilers, and Pittsburgh Steelers. Since 1995, the Jaguars have played most of their home games at what was originally called Jacksonville Municipal Stadium (now named TIAA Bank Field) on the site of the original Gator Bowl stadium.

On September 3, 1995, the Jaguars played their first ever regular season game in Jacksonville against the Oilers, who had existed since the founding of the American Football League in 1960. Houston receiver Haywood Jeffires caught the game's only touchdown in a 10–3 Oilers victory. Four weeks later, the clubs met again in Houston. In the fourth quarter, Desmond Howard caught a 15-yard pass from Jaguars quarterback Mark Brunell to lift Jacksonville to a 17–16 win. Following the 1995 season, Oilers owner Bud Adams confirmed that his team would relocate to Nashville, Tennessee in time for the 1998 season. The announcement resulted in low attendance at the Houston Astrodome and the loss of many of the Oilers' radio affiliates. In another meeting in Jacksonville on September 8, 1996, Brunell threw the Jaguars' game-winning touchdown to Keenan McCardell to secure a 34–27 victory. Three months later in front of an Astrodome crowd of only 20,196, Oilers quarterback Steve McNair collected 308 passing yards as he led Houston to a 23–17 victory. A year earlier than originally expected, the Oilers left Houston and moved their home games to the Liberty Bowl in Memphis, Tennessee. The Jaguars held off a second half rally by the Oilers to win in Memphis 30–24 on November 2, 1997. Two weeks later in Jacksonville, the Jaguars completed their sweep of the Oilers with a 17–9 win.

By the 1998 season, the Oilers were playing their home games in Nashville at Vanderbilt Stadium. In Nashville on September 27, 1998, two fourth quarter field goals by Jacksonville kicker Mike Hollis lifted the Jaguars to a 27–22 victory, their fourth straight against the Oilers. The streak ended on December 13 in Jacksonville when Al Del Greco's 41-yard field goal lifted the Oilers to a 16–13 win. The Jaguars won the AFC Central title in 1998 but lost in the playoffs to the New York Jets. For the 1999 season, the Oilers changed their name to the Tennessee Titans and began playing their home games at their new stadium, Adelphia Coliseum (now named Nissan Stadium). In Jacksonville on September 26, 1999, the Titans rallied from a 17–7 deficit to defeat the Jaguars 20–19. Three months later in Nashville the Titans dominated the Jaguars 41–14. Despite this result, Jacksonville won the AFC Central for a second consecutive season and finished the regular season with a 14–2 record, both losses to Tennessee. Jacksonville was the No. 1 seed in the AFC and had a first-round bye, but the No. 4 seed Tennessee, with a record of 13–3, hosted the Buffalo Bills in a wild card game. The Titans dramatically defeated the Bills 22–16 by means of the Music City Miracle play and traveled to Indianapolis the following weekend, where they defeated the Colts 19–16. Meanwhile, Jacksonville won its divisional round home game over the Miami Dolphins 62–7. On January 23, 2000, the Titans and Jaguars met for the third time in the 1999 season in Jacksonville for the AFC Championship Game. At halftime, the Jaguars led 14–10, but the Titans stormed back to win 33–14. For the first time since 1961, the franchise had won the AFL/AFC title. The Titans faced the St. Louis Rams in Super Bowl XXXIV, only to lose 23–16 in a game that came down to the final play.

2000s
The Titans and Jaguars continued their late 90s success into the early 2000s and remained competitive with one another, staying in the same division when the NFL realigned its divisions. The Jaguars and Titans joined the Indianapolis Colts and the newly-formed Houston Texans to form the AFC South. Though Brunell and McNair eventually left for other teams, they were eventually replaced at quarterback by David Garrard and Vince Young. Running backs Maurice Jones-Drew for the Jaguars and Chris Johnson for the Titans began playing in this decade, becoming two of the most dominant halfbacks in the league. However, the rise of the Colts led by Peyton Manning and a departure of talent from the Jaguars and Titans over the years led to a decline in the two teams' success towards the end of the 2000s, which allowed the Colts to dominate the AFC South throughout the 2000s. Until 2017, the Jaguars last made the playoffs in 2007 and the Titans last qualified in 2008.

2010s
The Jaguars and Titans began this decade without much success, both missing the playoffs each year until 2017. Jaguars quarterback David Garrard was released after the 2010 season and replaced by 2011 draft pick Blaine Gabbert, who was ultimately unsuccessful during his tenure with the team. The Titans drafted quarterback Jake Locker in the same draft after releasing Vince Young due to offseason troubles, but injuries plagued Locker's career and he retired after only four years.

On December 22, 2013, Maurice Jones-Drew and Chris Johnson faced each other one final time at EverBank Field in Jacksonville, where the Titans won over the Jaguars 20–16. Jones-Drew last played for the Oakland Raiders in 2014, while Johnson later played for the New York Jets and Arizona Cardinals and is a free agent as of the end of 2017. On December 18, 2014, the 2–12 Jaguars defeated the 2–12 Titans 21–13 on Thursday Night Football in Jacksonville. The Titans' and Jaguars' respective coaching staffs faced off in the Senior Bowl on January 24, 2015. Ken Whisenhunt's staff coached the North while Gus Bradley's staff directed the South.

By 2015, Gabbert and Locker had been replaced by new quarterbacks Blake Bortles and Marcus Mariota on the Jaguars and Titans, respectively. After years of bottom feeding in the AFC South, the two teams took advantage of a Colts team missing their star quarterback Andrew Luck due to injury in 2017 and returned to the playoffs that year. Though the Jaguars had already clinched the AFC South, the Titans made it in by beating the Jaguars in week 17. Both teams would lose to the defending Super Bowl champion New England Patriots, with the Titans losing 35–14 in the divisional round, and the Jaguars losing 24–20 in the conference championship (after attaining a 20–10 4th quarter lead).

2020s
After a couple of years of Titans dominance, 2022 saw both teams play each other late in the season with the AFC South in the balance. In week 14, the Jaguars defeated the Titans 36-22, capitalizing on four Titans turnovers to stay alive in the AFC South race. Both teams eventually battled for the AFC South division championship in week 18. The Titans got out to an early 10-0 lead, but the Jaguars forced a fumble on Joshua Dobbs in the fourth quarter that Josh Allen of the Jags returned for a touchdown to win the game 20-16 and get in the postseason.

Season-by-season results

|-
| 
| Tie 1–1
| style="| Oilers  10–3
| style="| Jaguars  17–16
| Tie  1–1
| Jaguars' inaugural season.  Game in Jacksonville was Jaguars' first game as a franchise.
|-
| 
| Tie 1–1
| style="| Oilers  34–27
| style="| Jaguars  24–17
| Tie  2–2
| 
|-
| 
| style="| 
| style="| Jaguars  17–9
| style="| Jaguars  30–24
| Jaguars  4–2
| Oilers move to Tennessee, play home games at Liberty Bowl in Memphis
|-
| 
| Tie 1–1
| style="| Oilers  16–13
| style="| Jaguars  27–22
| Jaguars  5–3
| Oilers play home games at Vanderbilt Stadium in Nashville
|-
| 
| style="| 
| style="| Titans  20–19
| style="| Titans  41–14
| Tie  5–5
| Oilers change name to "Tennessee Titans."  Titans open Nissan Stadium (then known as Adelphia Coliseum).  Titans lose Super Bowl XXXIV. Jaguars finish the season 14–2, with both losses coming to the Titans.
|- style="background:#f2f2f2; font-weight:bold;"
|  1999 Playoffs
| style="| 
| style="| Titans  33–14
| 
|  Titans  6–5
|  AFC Championship, only playoff meeting between the two teams. Jaguars finish 0–3 against the Titans in 1999 and 15–0 against the rest of the NFL.
|-

|-
| 
| Tie 1–1
| style="| Jaguars  16–13
| style="| Titans  27–13
| Titans  7–6
| 
|-
| 
| Tie 1–1
| style="| Jaguars  13–6
| style="| Titans  28–24
| Titans  8–7
|
|-
| 
| style="| 
| style="| Titans  28–10
| style="| Titans  23–14
| Titans  10–7
| Both teams placed in the AFC South following 2002 NFL realignment 
|-
| 
| style="| 
| style="| Titans  30–17
| style="| Titans  10–3
| Titans  12–7
| 
|-
| 
| Tied 1–1
| style="| Titans  18–15
| style="| Jaguars  15–12
| Titans  13–8
| 
|-
| 
| style="| 
| style="| Jaguars  40–13
| style="| Jaguars  31–28
| Titans  13–10
| 
|-
| 
| Tie 1–1
| style="| Jaguars  37–7
| style="| Titans  24–17
| Titans  14–11
| 
|-
| 
| Tied 1–1
| style="| Titans  13–10
| style="| Jaguars  28–13
| Titans  15–12
| 
|-
| 
| style="| 
| style="| Titans  24–14
| style="| Titans  17–10
| Titans  17–12
|
|-
| 
| Tie 1–1
| style="| Jaguars  37–17
| style="| Titans  30–13
| Titans  18–13
|

|-
| 
| Tie 1–1
| style="| Titans  30–3
| style="| Jaguars  17–6
| Titans  19–14
| 
|-
| 
| Tie 1–1
| style="| Jaguars  16–14
| style="| Titans  23–17
| Titans  20–15
| 
|-
| 
| Tie 1–1
| style="| Jaguars  24–19
| style="| Titans  38–20
| Titans  21–16
|
|-
| 
| Tie 1–1
| style="| Titans  20–16
| style="| Jaguars  29–27
| Titans  22–17
| 
|-
| 
| Tie 1–1
| style="| Jaguars  21-13
| style="| Titans  16-14
| Titans  23–18
|
|-
| 
| Tie 1–1
| style="| Jaguars  19–13
| style="| Titans  42–39
| Titans  24–19
| 
|-
| 
| Tie 1–1
| style="| Jaguars  38–17
| style="| Titans  36–22
| Titans  25–20
| Teams split season series eight consecutive years
|-
| 
| style="| 
| style="| Titans  37–16
| style="| Titans  15–10
| Titans  27–20
| Both teams make playoffs, each ending 8+ season playoff droughts. Tennessee's playoff berth was clinched in their week 17 meeting at home.
|-
| 
| style="| 
| style="| Titans  9–6
| style="| Titans  30–9
| Titans  29–20
| Derrick Henry runs for a 99-yard touchdown in Titans win in Nashville, tying an NFL record.
|- 
| 
| Tie 1–1
| style="| Jaguars  20–7
| style="| Titans  42–20
| Titans  30–21
| 
|-

|-
| 
| style="| 
| style="| Titans  31–10
| style="| Titans  33–30
| Titans  32–21
| 
|-
| 
| style="| 
| style="| Titans  37–19
| style="| Titans  20–0
| Titans  34–21
| 
|-
| 
| style="| 
| style="| Jaguars  20–16 
| style="| Jaguars  36–22
| Titans  34–23
| Jaguars clinched AFC South division title for the first time since 2017 following their first series sweep over the Titans since 2005.
|- 

|-
| Regular season
| style="|Titans 33–23
| Titans 15–13 
| Titans 18–10
|  
|-
| Postseason
| style="|Titans 1–0
| Titans 1–0
| no games
| 1999 AFC Championship Game
|-
| Regular and postseason 
| style="|Titans 34–23
| Titans 16–13 
| Titans 18–10
| 
|-

References

External links
 Jaguars-Titans head-to-head record

Jacksonville Jaguars
Tennessee Titans
National Football League rivalries
Tennessee Titans rivalries
Jacksonville Jaguars rivalries